Delphinatia glacialis is a species of medium-sized, air-breathing, land snail, a terrestrial pulmonate gastropod mollusk in the family Helicidae, the true snails.

Anatomy

These snails create and use love darts.

References

 Bank, R. A.; Neubert, E. (2017). Checklist of the land and freshwater Gastropoda of Europe. Last update: July 16, 2017
 Image at 
 Taxonomy at 

glacialis
Gastropods described in 1832